Tim Huebschle is a Namibian film director and screenwriter.

After completing his high school in Windhoek, Tim Huebschle relocated to Cape Town and completed a Bachelor of Arts in English & German Literature at the University of Cape Town. During his studies, he participated in a few film theory seminars and subsequently chose to follow a career in the film industry. He started making independent short films in 2000, after leaving South Africa and moving to Berlin to pursue internships at production companies in the German capital. In 2003 he returned to Namibia where he had secured a production budget for Savanna Stories, a 13-part documentary series, aired on the Namibian Broadcasting Corporation (NBC). Upon completion of the series in 2005 Huebschle continued to work as director on a wide range of short films, documentaries, music videos and commercials. Throughout the years he collected numerous local and international accolades for his work. In 2009 he co-founded the Namibian film production company Collective Productions. In 2013/14 he directed 26 episodes of a documentary series and 20 episodes of a children's series for the afternoon programming of the German TV station ARD. Huebschle premiered his debut full-length feature entitled #LANDoftheBRAVEfilm in October 2019.

Awards & Nominations

Selected filmography

References

University of Cape Town alumni
Namibian film producers
Namibian film directors
Living people
1978 births